Kosugi Station may refer to:
 Kosugi Station (Imizu), an Ainokaze Toyama Railway station in Imizu, Toyama, Japan
 Kosugi Station (Toyama, Toyama), a Toyama Chihō Railway station in Toyama, Toyama, Japan